The 2012 New York Mets season was the franchise's 51st season and its fourth in Citi Field. The team celebrated its 50th anniversary, as they became a team in 1962. Johan Santana pitched the first no-hitter in franchise history on June 1, 2012. The Mets missed the post season for a 6th straight year.

Offseason
Shortly after the 2011 season ended, the Mets made changes to their coaching staff, keeping only pitching coach Dan Warthen and hitting coach Dave Hudgens. 3rd base coach Chip Hale went to the Oakland Athletics to join manager Bob Melvin. General Manager Sandy Alderson said that the "changes were necessary for us to move forward." Former A's manager Bob Geren was named to replace Hale.

The additions were intended to improve the depth of the bullpen, which was sub-par in the 2011 season. They added reliever Ramon Ramírez and center fielder Andrés Torres, in exchange for the starting center fielder Ángel Pagán. They also signed Frank Francisco to be their closer, and added Jon Rauch, who was the tallest current player in the major leagues, to be the set-up man for Francisco.

For 2012, the Mets made several construction changes to Citi Field's dimensions. In center field a new 8 foot wall was built in front of the 16 foot wall, coined by fans as "The Great Wall of Flushing." In right field, a new wall in front of the existing Mo's Zone was also built.

The Mets overhauled their uniforms for 2012. The cream colored pinstriped uniform became the primary home uniform, while the snow white uniforms served as the alternate home uniform. The black drop-shadows were removed from the pinstriped, snow white and road gray jerseys and the black two toned cap was retired. The black jersey and all black cap was worn on a limited basis on the road and was retired at the end of the season. The Mets wore two patches, one commemorating the team's 50th anniversary and another honoring Gary Carter, who died of brain cancer on February 16, 2012.

Regular season
The Mets began their 2012 season with a surprising three-game sweep of the Atlanta Braves. The Mets outscored the Braves 12 to 6 in the series. During that series, Frank Francisco became the third player in major league history to record a save in every game of a season-opening series of at least three games, following Derrick Turnbow of the Milwaukee Brewers in 2006 and Salomón Torres of the Pittsburgh Pirates in 2007.

On June 1, Johan Santana made club history by becoming the first Mets pitcher to throw a no-hitter, in an 8–0 victory over the St. Louis Cardinals. This was also the first no-hitter to be pitched against a defending World Series champion since a former Met, Nolan Ryan, did it against the Oakland Athletics in their 1990 pennant season while with the Texas Rangers.

On June 27 against the Chicago Cubs, the Mets became the first major league team to hit a home run cycle. Daniel Murphy began with a two-run home run, his run in 352 at-bats, then in the top of the fifth, then Ike Davis hit a three-run home run followed by Murphy's solo home run off of Casey Coleman, who had replaced starting pitcher Jeff Samardzija. In the sixth inning, Scott Hairston, who was typically a utility outfielder throughout the first half of the season, hit the cycle ending grand slam off of Coleman. The Mets won the game, 17–1.

R. A. Dickey won the 2012 Cy Young Award, becoming the first knuckleball pitcher to do so.

Season standings

NL East standings

NL Wild Card

Record vs. opponents

Game log 

|- style="text-align:center; background:#bfb;"
| 1 || April 5 || Braves || 1–0 || Ramírez (1–0) || Hanson (0–1) || Francisco (1) || 42,080 || 1–0 || W1
|- style="text-align:center; background:#bfb;"
| 2 || April 7 || Braves || 4–2 || Dickey (1–0) || Jurrjens (0–1) || Francisco (2) || 39,526 || 2–0 || W2
|- style="text-align:center; background:#bfb;"
| 3 || April 8 || Braves || 7–5 || Niese (1–0) || Minor (0–1) || Francisco (3) || 27,855 || 3–0 || W3
|- style="text-align:center; background:#bfb;"
| 4 || April 9 || Nationals || 4–3 || Rauch (1–0) || Rodríguez (0–1) || || 23,970 || 4–0 || W4
|- style="text-align:center; background:#fbb;"
| 5 || April 10 || Nationals || 2–6 || Detwiler (1–0) || Gee (0–1) || || 26,927 || 4–1 || L1
|- style="text-align:center; background:#fbb;"
| 6 || April 11 || Nationals || 0–4 || Strasburg (1–0) || Santana (0–1) || || 34,614 || 4–2 || L2
|- style="text-align:center; background:#bfb;"
| 7 || April 13 || @ Phillies || 5–2 || Dickey (2–0) || Lee (0–1) || || 45,429 || 5–2 || W1
|- style="text-align:center; background:#bfb;"
| 8 || April 14 || @ Phillies || 5–0 || Niese (2–0) || Worley (0–1) || || 45,750 || 6–2 || W2
|- style="text-align:center; background:#fbb;"
| 9 || April 15 || @ Phillies || 2–8 || Hamels (1–1) || Ramírez (1–1) || || 45,829 || 6–3 || L1
|- style="text-align:center; background:#bfb;"
| 10 || April 16 || @ Braves || 6–1 || Gee (1–1) || Hanson (1–2) || || 16,161 || 7–3 || W1
|- style="text-align:center; background:#fbb;"
| 11 || April 17 || @ Braves || 3–9 || Delgado (2–0) || Santana (0–2) || || 18,732 || 7–4 || L1
|- style="text-align:center; background:#fbb;"
| 12 || April 18 || @ Braves || 6–14 || Martínez (1–0) || Dickey (2–1) || || 17,909 || 7–5 || L2
|- style="text-align:center; background:#fbb;"
| 13 || April 20 || Giants || 3–4 (10) || Romo (1–0) || Francisco (0–1) || Hensley (1) || 30,544 || 7–6 || L3
|- style="text-align:center; background:#bfb;"
| 14 || April 21 || Giants || 5–4 || Rauch (2–0) || Hensley (1–1) || || 33,844 || 8–6 || W1
|- style="text-align:center; background:#bbb;"
| – || April 22 || Giants ||colspan=7|Game Postponed (rain) (to be made up as a doubleheader on 4/23)
|- style="text-align:center; background:#fbb;"
| 15 || April 23 || Giants || 1–6 || Lincecum (1–2) || Batista (0–1) || || || 8–7 || L1
|- style="text-align:center; background:#fbb;"
| 16 || April 23 || Giants || 2–7 || Bumgarner (3–1) || Gee (1–2) || || 23,866 || 8–8 || L2
|- style="text-align:center; background:#bfb;"
| 17 || April 24 || Marlins || 2–1 || Rauch (3–0) || Mujica (0–2) || Francisco (4) || 20,192 || 9–8 || W1
|- style="text-align:center; background:#bfb;"
| 18 || April 25 || Marlins || 5–1 || Dickey (3–1) || Buehrle (1–3)|| || 20,623 || 10–8 || W2
|- style="text-align:center; background:#bfb;"
| 19 || April 26 || Marlins || 3–2 || Ramírez (2–1) || Bell (0–3) || || 20,660 || 11–8 || W3
|- style="text-align:center; background:#fbb;"
| 20 || April 27 || @ Rockies || 9–18 || Reynolds (3–0) || Acosta (0–1) || || 35,103 || 11–9 || L1
|- style="text-align:center; background:#bfb;"
| 21 || April 28 || @ Rockies || 7–5 || Gee (2–2) || Moscoso (0–1) || Francisco (5) || 38,798 || 12–9 || W1
|- style="text-align:center; background:#bfb;"
| 22 || April 29 || @ Rockies || 6–5 (11) || Francisco (1–1) || Belisle (1–2) || Ramírez (1) || 36,690 || 13–9 || W2
|- style="text-align:center; background:#fbb;"
| 23 || April 30 || @ Astros || 3–4 || Rodriguez (1–3) || Acosta (0–2) || Myers (5) || 17,536 || 13–10 || L1
|-

|- style="text-align:center; background:#fbb;"
| 24 || May 1 || @ Astros || 3–6 || Happ (2–1) || Niese (2–1) || Myers (6) || 17,958 || 13–11 || L2
|- style="text-align:center; background:#fbb;"
| 25 || May 2 || @ Astros || 1–8 || Rodríguez (3–2) || Schwinden (0–1) || || 19,442 || 13–12 || L3
|- style="text-align:center; background:#fbb;"
| 26 || May 4 || Diamondbacks || 4–5 || Ziegler (1–1) || Rauch (3–1) || Putz (6) || 26,995 || 13–13 || L4
|- style="text-align:center; background:#bfb;"
| 27 || May 5 || Diamondbacks || 4–3 || Santana (1–2) || Corbin (1–1) || Francisco (6) || 30,253 || 14–13 || W1
|- style="text-align:center; background:#bfb;"
| 28 || May 6 || Diamondbacks || 3–1 || Dickey (4–1) || Cahill (2–3) || Francisco (7) || 29,107 || 15–13 || W2
|- style="text-align:center; background:#bfb;"
| 29 || May 7 || @ Phillies || 5–2 || Byrdak (1–0) || Papelbon (0–1) || Francisco (8) || 44,365 || 16–13 || W3
|- style="text-align:center; background:#bfb;"
| 30 || May 8 || @ Phillies || 7–4 || Acosta (1–2) || Qualls (1–1) || Rauch (1) || 43,821 || 17–13 || W4
|- style="text-align:center; background:#bfb;"
| 31 || May 9 || @ Phillies || 10–6 || Byrdak (2–0) || Kendrick (0–3) || || 43,840 || 18–13 || W5
|- style="text-align:center; background:#fbb;"
| 32 || May 11 || @ Marlins || 5–6 || Bell (1–3) || Francisco (1–2) || || 31,007 || 18–14 || L1
|- style="text-align:center; background:#bfb;"
| 33 || May 12 || @ Marlins || 9–3 || Dickey (5–1) || Nolasco (4–1) || || 32,128 || 19–14 || W1
|- style="text-align:center; background:#fbb;"
| 34 || May 13 || @ Marlins || 4–8 || Bell (2–3) || Francisco (1–3) || || 26,401 || 19–15 || L1
|- style="text-align:center; background:#bfb;"
| 35 || May 14 || Brewers || 3–1 || Batista (1–1) || Gallardo (2–4) || Francisco (9) || 20,061 || 20–15 || W1
|- style="text-align:center; background:#fbb;"
| 36 || May 15 || Brewers || 0–8 || Greinke (4–1) || Gee (2–3) || || 22,268 || 20–16 ||L1
|- style="text-align:center; background:#fbb;"
| 37 || May 16 || Reds || 3–6 || Arredondo (3–1) || Rauch (3–2) || Marshall (7) || 22,659 || 20–17 || L2
|- style="text-align:center; background:#bfb;"
| 38 || May 17 || Reds || 9–4 || Parnell (1–0) || Ondrusek (3–1) || || 29,943 || 21–17 || W1
|- style="text-align:center; background:#fbb;"
| 39 || May 18 || @ Blue Jays || 5–14 || Romero (5–1) || Niese (2–2) || || 26,712 || 21–18 || L1
|- style="text-align:center; background:#fbb;"
| 40 || May 19 || @ Blue Jays || 0–2 || Morrow (5–2) || Hefner (0–1) || || 34,962 || 21–19 || L2
|- style="text-align:center; background:#bfb;"
| 41 || May 20 || @ Blue Jays || 6–5 || Gee (3–3) || Álvarez (3–4) || Francisco (10) || 41,867 || 22–19 || W1
|- style="text-align:center; background:#fbb;"
| 42 || May 21 || @ Pirates || 4–5 || Hughes (1–0) || Rauch (3–3) || Hanrahan (10) || 14,556 || 22–20 || L1
|- style="text-align:center; background:#bfb;"
| 43 || May 22 || @ Pirates || 3–2 || Dickey (6–1) || Cruz (1–1) || Francisco (11) || 15,794 || 23–20 || W1
|- style="text-align:center; background:#bfb;"
| 44 || May 23 || @ Pirates || 3–1 || Niese (3–2) || Morton (2–5) || Francisco (12) || 25,731 || 24–20 || W2
|- style="text-align:center; background:#fbb;"
| 45 || May 24 || Padres || 5–11 || Stults (1–0) || Hefner (0–2) || || 24,109 || 24–21 || L1
|- style="text-align:center; background:#bfb;"
| 46 || May 25 || Padres || 6–1 || Gee (4–3) || Bass (2–5) || || 24,498 || 25–21 ||W1
|- style="text-align:center; background:#bfb;"
| 47 || May 26 || Padres || 9–0 || Santana (2–2) || Richard (2–6) || || 28,745 || 26–21 ||W2
|- style="text-align:center; background:#bfb;"
| 48 || May 27 || Padres || 2–0 || Dickey (7–1) || Vólquez (2–5) || Francisco (13) || 28,361 || 27–21 ||W3
|- style="text-align:center; background:#fbb;"
| 49 || May 28 || Phillies || 4–8 || Hamels (8–1) || Parnell (1–1) || || 32,122 || 27–22 || L1
|- style="text-align:center; background:#bfb;"
| 50 || May 29 || Phillies|| 6–3 || Hefner (1–2) || Blanton (4–5) || Francisco (14) || 25,487 || 28–22 || W1
|- style="text-align:center; background:#fbb;"
| 51 || May 30 || Phillies || 6–10 || Bastardo (2–1) || Rauch (3–4) || || 30,064 || 28–23 || L1
|-

|- style="text-align:center; background:#bfb;"
| 52 || June 1 || Cardinals || 8–0 || Santana (3–2) || Wainwright (4–6) || || 27,069 || 29–23 || W1
|- style="text-align:center; background:#bfb;"
| 53 || June 2 || Cardinals || 5–0 || Dickey (8–1) || Lynn (8–2) || || 27,914 || 30–23 || W2
|- style="text-align:center; background:#bfb;"
| 54 || June 3 || Cardinals || 6–1 || Niese (4–2) || Westbrook (4–5) || || 23,559 || 31–23 || W3
|- style="text-align:center; background:#fbb;"
| 55 || June 4 || Cardinals || 4–5 || Rzepczynski (1–3) || Rauch (3–5) || Motte (9) || 25,830 || 31–24 || L1
|- style="text-align:center; background:#fbb;"
| 56 || June 5 || @ Nationals || 6–7 (12) || Detwiler (4–3) || Ramírez (0–1) || || 26,256 || 31–25 || L2
|- style="text-align:center; background:#fbb;"
| 57 || June 6 || @ Nationals || 3–5 || Jackson (2–3) || Hefner (1–3) || Clippard (5) || 27,335 || 31–26 || L3
|- style="text-align:center; background:#bfb;"
| 58 || June 7 || @ Nationals || 3–1 || Dickey (9–1) || Wang (1–2) || Francisco (15) || 32,096 || 32–26 ||W1
|- style="text-align:center; background:#fbb;"
| 59 || June 8 || @ Yankees || 1–9 || Kuroda (5–6) || Santana (3–3) || || 48,566 || 32–27 || L1
|- style="text-align:center; background:#fbb;"
| 60 || June 9 || @ Yankees || 2–4 || Hughes (6–5) || Gee (4–4) || Soriano (9) || 48,575 || 32–28 || L2
|- style="text-align:center; background:#fbb;"
| 61 || June 10 || @ Yankees || 4–5 || Logan (1–0) || Rauch (3–6) || || 49,010 || 32–29 || L3
|- style="text-align:center; background:#bfb;"
| 62 || June 12 || @ Rays || 11–2 || Young (1–0) || Cobb (2–3) || || 17,334 || 33–29 || W1
|- style="text-align:center; background:#bfb;"
| 63 || June 13 || @ Rays || 9–1 || Dickey (10–1) || Price (8–4) || || 18,496 || 34–29 || W2
|- style="text-align:center; background:#bfb;"
| 64 || June 14 || @ Rays || 9–6 || Santana (4–3) || Hellickson (4–3) || Francisco (16) || 21,947 || 35–29 || W3
|- style="text-align:center; background:#fbb;"
| 65 || June 15 || Reds || 3–7 || Arroyo (3–4) || Gee (4–5) || || 34,716 || 35–30 || L1
|- style="text-align:center; background:#fbb;"
| 66 || June 16 || Reds || 1–4 || Bailey (5–4) || Niese (4–3) || Chapman (8) || 27,988 || 35–31 || L2
|- style="text-align:center; background:#fbb;"
| 67 || June 17 || Reds || 1–3 || Cueto (8–3) || Young (1–1) || Marshall (9) || 40,134 || 35–32 || L3
|- style="text-align:center; background:#bfb;"
| 68 || June 18 || Orioles || 5–0 || Dickey (11–1) || Arrieta (3–9) || || 29,014 || 36–32|| W1
|- style="text-align:center; background:#bfb;"
| 69 || June 19 || Orioles || 5–0 || Santana (5–3) || Hunter (3–4) || || 32,587 || 37–32 || W2
|- style="text-align:center; background:#bfb;"
| 70 || June 20 || Orioles || 4–3 || Gee (5–5) || Matusz (5–8) || Francisco (17) || 29,855 || 38–32 || W3
|- style="text-align:center; background:#bfb;"
| 71 || June 22 || Yankees || 6–4 || Niese (5–3) || Pettitte (3–3) || Francisco (18) || 40,191 || 39–32 || W4
|- style="text-align:center; background:#fbb;"
| 72 || June 23 || Yankees || 3–4 || Rapada (2–0) || Rauch (3–7) || Soriano (14) || 42,122 || 39–33 || L1
|- style="text-align:center; background:#fbb;"
| 73 || June 24 || Yankees || 5–6 || Logan (2–0) || Batista (1–2) || Soriano (15) || 42,364 || 39–34 || L2
|- style="text-align:center; background:#fbb;"
| 74 || June 25 || @ Cubs || 1–6 || Wood (2–3) || Santana (5–4) || || 34,092 || 39–35 || L3
|- style="text-align:center; background:#fbb;"
| 75 || June 26 || @ Cubs || 3–5 || Maine (1–1) || Gee (5–6) || Mármol (5) || 34,064 || 39–36 || L4
|- style="text-align:center; background:#bfb;"
| 76 || June 27 || @ Cubs || 17–1 || Niese (6–3) || Samardzija (5–7) || || 35,837 || 40–36 || W1
|- style="text-align:center; background:#bfb;"
| 77 || June 28 || @ Dodgers || 3–2 || Young (2–1) || Capuano (9–3) || Parnell (1) || 49,006 || 41–36 || W2
|- style="text-align:center; background:#bfb;"
| 78 || June 29 || @ Dodgers || 9–0 || Dickey (12–1) || Harang (5–5) || || 49,763 || 42–36 || W3
|- style="text-align:center; background:#bfb;"
| 79 || June 30 || @ Dodgers || 5–0 || Santana (6–4) || Eovaldi (0–5) || || 44,217 || 43–36 || W4
|-

|- style="text-align:center; background:#fbb;"
| 80 || July 1 || @ Dodgers || 3–8 || Kershaw (6–4) || Gee (5–7) || || 55,359 || 43–37 || L1
|- style="text-align:center; background:#bfb;"
| 81 || July 3 || Phillies || 11–1 || Niese (7–3) || Worley (4–5) || || 42,516 || 44–37 || W1
|- style="text-align:center; background:#fbb;"
| 82 || July 4 || Phillies || 2–9 || Lee (1–5) || Young (2–2) || || 28,687 || 44–38 || L1
|- style="text-align:center; background:#bfb;"
| 83 || July 5 || Phillies || 6–5 || Parnell (2–1) || Papelbon (2–3) || || 28,409 || 45–38 || W1
|- style="text-align:center; background:#fbb;"
| 84 || July 6 || Cubs || 7–8 || Wood (4–3) || Santana (6–5) || || 27,956 || 45–39 || L1
|- style="text-align:center; background:#bfb;"
| 85 || July 7 || Cubs || 3–1 || Gee (6–7) || Samardzija (6–8) || Parnell (2) || 26,096 || 46–39 || W1
|- style="text-align:center; background:#fbb;"
| 86 || July 8 || Cubs || 0–7 || Dempster (4–3) || Niese (7–4) || || 25,920 || 46–40 || L1
|- style="text-align:center; background:khaki;"
| – || July 10 || colspan="8"|2012 Major League Baseball All-Star Game in Kansas City, Missouri
|- style="text-align:center; background:#fbb;"
| 87 || July 13 || @ Braves || 5–7 || Martínez (4–1) || Young (2–3) || Kimbrel (26) || 37,020 || 46–41 || L2
|- style="text-align:center; background:#fbb;"
| 88 || July 14 || @ Braves || 7–8 || Varvaro (1–0) || Parnell (2–2) || Kimbrel (27) || 32,565 || 46–42 || L3
|- style="text-align:center; background:#fbb;"
| 89 || July 15 || @ Braves || 1–6 || Sheets (1–0) || Santana (6–6) || || 23,382 || 46–43 || L4
|- style="text-align:center; background:#fbb;"
| 90 || July 17 || @ Nationals || 4–5 (10) || Mattheus (3–1) || Byrdak (2–1) || || 26,342 || 46–44 || L5
|- style="text-align:center; background:#fbb;"
| 91 || July 18 || @ Nationals || 3–4 || Zimmermann (7–6) || Young (2–4) || Clippard (15) || 31,660 || 46–45 || L6
|- style="text-align:center; background:#bfb;"
| 92 || July 19 || @ Nationals || 9–5 || Dickey (13–1) || Gonzalez (12–5) || || 36,389 || 47–45 ||W1
|- style="text-align:center; background:#fbb;"
| 93 || July 20 || Dodgers || 6–7 || Harang (7–5) || Santana (6–7) || Jansen (17) || 30,806 || 47–46 || L1
|- style="text-align:center; background:#fbb;"
| 94 || July 21 || Dodgers || 5–8 || Capuano (10–5) || Batista (1–3) || Jansen (18) || 33,503 || 47–47 || L2
|- style="text-align:center; background:#fbb;"
| 95 || July 22 || Dodgers || 3–8 (12) || Wall (1–0) || Ramírez (2–2) || || 31,184 || 47–48 || L3
|- style="text-align:center; background:#fbb;"
| 96 || July 23 || Nationals || 2–8 (10) || Gorzelanny (3–2) || Byrdak (2–2) || || 26,735 || 47–49 || L4
|- style="text-align:center; background:#fbb;"
| 97 || July 24 || Nationals || 2–5 || Gonzalez (13–5) || Dickey (13–2) || Clippard (17) || 36,236 || 47–50 || L5
|- style="text-align:center; background:#fbb;"
| 98 || July 25 || Nationals || 2–5 || Strasburg (11–4) || Hefner (1–4) || Clippard (18) || 35,517 || 47–51 || L6
|- style="text-align:center; background:#bfb;"
| 99 || July 26 || @ Diamondbacks || 3–1 || Harvey (1–0) || Miley (11–6) || Parnell (3) || 22,010 || 48–51 || W1
|- style="text-align:center; background:#fbb;"
| 100 || July 27 || @ Diamondbacks || 5–11 || Collmenter (3–2) || Niese (7–5) || || 23,150 || 48–52 || L1
|- style="text-align:center; background:#fbb;"
| 101 || July 28 || @ Diamondbacks || 3–6 || Kennedy (9–8) || Young (2–5) || Putz (19) || 33,759 || 48–53 || L2
|- style="text-align:center; background:#bfb;"
| 102 || July 29 || @ Diamondbacks || 5–1 || Dickey (14–2) || Saunders (5–7) || || 32,134 || 49–53 || W1
|- style="text-align:center; background:#bfb;"
| 103 || July 30 || @ Giants || 8–7 (10) || Edgin (1–0) || Casilla (4–5) || Acosta (1) || 41,300 || 50–53 || W2
|- style="text-align:center; background:#fbb;"
| 104 || July 31 || @ Giants || 1–4 || Lincecum (5–11) || Harvey (1–1) || Affeldt (2) || 41,774 || 50–54 || L1
|-

|- style="text-align:center; background:#bfb;"
| 105 || August 1 || @ Giants || 2–1 || Niese (8–5) || Cain (10–4) || Parnell (4) || 42,188 || 51–54 || W1
|- style="text-align:center; background:#bfb;"
| 106 || August 2 || @ Giants || 9–1 || Young (3–5) || Zito (8–8) || || 41,843 || 52–54 || W2
|- style="text-align:center; background:#fbb;"
| 107 || August 3 || @ Padres || 1–3 || Richard (8–11) || Dickey (14–3) || Street (18) || 34,573 || 52–55 || L1
|- style="text-align:center; background:#bfb;"
| 108 || August 4 || @ Padres || 6–2 || Hefner (2–4) || Vólquez (7–8) || Francisco (19) || 36,826 || 53–55 || W1
|- style="text-align:center; background:#fbb;"
| 109 || August 5 || @ Padres || 3–7 || Marquis (7–10) || Harvey (1–2) || || 24,635 || 53–56 || L1
|- style="text-align:center; background:#fbb;"
| 110 || August 7 || Marlins || 2–4 || Zambrano (7–9) || Niese (8–6) || Cishek (7) || 28,968 || 53–57 || L2
|- style="text-align:center; background:#fbb;"
| 111 || August 8 || Marlins || 0–13 || Eovaldi (3–7) || Young (3–6) || || 26,193 || 53–58 || L3
|- style="text-align:center; background:#bfb;"
| 112 || August 9 || Marlins || 6–1 || Dickey (15–3) || Johnson (7–8) || || 28,985 || 54–58 || W1
|- style="text-align:center; background:#fbb;"
| 113 || August 10 || Braves || 0–4 || Maholm (10–7) || Harvey (1–3) || || 25,101 || 54–59 || L1
|- style="text-align:center; background:#fbb;"
| 114 || August 11 || Braves || 3–9 || Medlen (3–1) || Santana (6–8) || || 30,388 || 54–60 || L2
|- style="text-align:center; background:#bfb;"
| 115 || August 12 || Braves || 6–5 || Niese (9–6) || Sheets (4–2) || Rauch (2) || 24,891 || 55–60 || W1
|- style="text-align:center; background:#fbb;"
| 116 || August 14 || @ Reds || 0–3 || Arredondo (5–2) || Acosta (1–3) || || 26,113 || 55–61 || L1
|- style="text-align:center; background:#fbb;"
| 117 || August 15 || @ Reds || 1–6 || Leake (5–7) || Dickey (15–4) || || 26,082 || 55–62 || L2
|- style="text-align:center; background:#bfb;"
| 118 || August 16 || @ Reds || 8–4 || Harvey (2–3) || Bailey (10–8) || Rauch (3) || 23,137 || 56–62 || W1
|- style="text-align:center; background:#fbb;"
| 119 || August 17 || @ Nationals || 4–6 || Detwiler (7–5) || Santana (6–9) || Clippard (26) || 34,827 || 56–63 || L1
|- style="text-align:center; background:#bfb;"
| 120 || August 18 || @ Nationals || 2–0 || Niese (10–6) || Jackson (7–8) || Francisco (20) || 42,662 || 57–63 || W1
|- style="text-align:center; background:#fbb;"
| 121 || August 19 || @ Nationals || 2–5 || Gonzalez (16–6) || Hefner (2–5) || Clippard (27) || 33,764 || 57–64 ||L1
|- style="text-align:center; background:#fbb;"
| 122 || August 20 || Rockies || 1–3 || Brothers (7–2) || Edgin (1–1) || Betancourt (24) || 23,833 || 57–65 || L2
|- style="text-align:center; background:#fbb;"
| 123 || August 21 || Rockies || 2–6 || Chacín (1–3) || Young (3–7) || || 27,633 || 57–66 || L3
|- style="text-align:center; background:#fbb;"
| 124 || August 22 || Rockies || 2–5 || Torres (2–1) || Ramírez (2–3) || Betancourt (25) || 22,204 || 57–67 ||L4
|- style="text-align:center; background:#fbb;"
| 125 || August 23 || Rockies || 0–1 || Brothers (8–2) || Parnell (2–3) || Belisle (1) || 22,544 || 57–68 ||L5
|- style="text-align:center; background:#fbb;"
| 126 || August 24 || Astros || 1–3 || Lyles (3–10) || Niese (10–7) || López (2) || 25,513 || 57–69 || L6
|- style="text-align:center; background:#bfb;"
| 127 || August 25 || Astros || 3–1 || Dickey (16–4) || Abad (0–1) || Francisco (21) || 29,906 || 58–69 || W1
|- style="text-align:center; background:#bfb;"
| 128 || August 26 || Astros || 2–1 || Parnell (3–3) || López (5–2) || || 25,071 || 59–69 || W2
|- style="text-align:center; background:#bfb;"
| 129 || August 28 || @ Phillies || 9–5 (10) || Parnell (4–3) || Rosenberg (0–2) || || 41,227 || 60–69 || W3
|- style="text-align:center; background:#bfb;"
| 130 || August 29 || @ Phillies || 3–2 || Harvey (3–3) || Cloyd (0–1) || Francisco (22) || 42,882 || 61–69 || W4
|- style="text-align:center; background:#fbb;"
| 131 || August 30 || @ Phillies || 2–3 || Kendrick (8–9) || Niese (10–8) || Papelbon (30) || 43,141 || 61–70 || L1
|- style="text-align:center; background:#bfb;"
| 132 || August 31 || @ Marlins || 3–0 || Dickey (17–4) || Eovaldi (4–10) || || 23,099 || 62–70 || W1
|-

|- style="text-align:center; background:#bfb;"
| 133 || September 1 || @ Marlins || 5–3 || Ramírez (3–3) || Cishek (4–2) || Francisco (23) || 26,402 || 63–70 || W2
|- style="text-align:center; background:#bfb;"
| 134 || September 2 || @ Marlins || 5–1 || Young (4–7) || Buehrle (12–12) || || 25,333 || 64–70 || W3
|- style="text-align:center; background:#fbb;"
| 135 || September 3 || @ Cardinals || 4–5 || Kelly (5–6) || McHugh (0–1) || Motte (33) || 40,952 || 64–71 || L1
|- style="text-align:center; background:#fbb;"
| 136 || September 4 || @ Cardinals || 1–5 || García (4–6) || Harvey (3–4) || || 34,108 || 64–72 || L2
|- style="text-align:center; background:#bfb;"
| 137 || September 5 || @ Cardinals || 6–2 || Dickey (18–4) || Wainwright (13–12) || || 30,090 || 65–72 || W1
|- style="text-align:center; background:#fbb;"
| 138 || September 7 || Braves || 0–3 || Maholm (12–9) || Niese (10–9) || Kimbrel (35) || 24,071 || 65–73 || L1
|- style="text-align:center; background:#fbb;"
| 139 || September 8 || Braves || 3–11 || Medlen (8–1) || Hefner (2–6) || || 25,603 || 65–74 || L2
|- style="text-align:center; background:#fbb;"
| 140 || September 9 || Braves || 2–3 (10) || Kimbrel (1–1) || Parnell (4–4) || Moylan (1) || 23,161 || 65–75 || L3
|- style="text-align:center; background:#fbb;"
| 141 || September 10 || Nationals || 1–5 || Gonzalez (19–7) || McHugh (0–2) || || 21,923 || 65–76 || L4
|- style="text-align:center; background:#fbb;"
| 142 || September 11 || Nationals || 3–5 || Gorzelanny (4–2) || Dickey (18–5) || Clippard (31) || 22,596 || 65–77 || L5
|- style="text-align:center; background:#fbb;"
| 143 || September 12 || Nationals || 0–2 || Lannan (3–0) || Harvey (3–5) || Storen (2) || 21,205 || 65–78 || L6
|- style="text-align:center; background:#bfb;"
| 144 || September 14 || @ Brewers || 7–3 || Niese (11–9) || Fiers (9–8) || || 38,216 || 66–78 || W1
|- style="text-align:center; background:#fbb;"
| 145 || September 15 || @ Brewers || 6–9 || Kintzler (2–0) || Mejía (0–1) || || 38,108 || 66–79 || L1
|- style="text-align:center; background:#fbb;"
| 146 || September 16 || @ Brewers || 0–3 || Peralta (2–0) || Young (4–8) || Axford (29) || 38,677 || 66–80 || L2
|- style="text-align:center; background:#fbb;"
| 147 || September 17 || Phillies || 1–3 || Lee (6–7) || Dickey (18–6) || Papelbon (35) || 20,527 || 66–81 || L3
|- style="text-align:center; background:#bbb;"
| – || September 18 || Phillies || colspan=7 | Postponed (rain) (to be made up on 9/20)
|- style="text-align:center; background:#fbb;"
| 148 || September 19 || Phillies || 2–3 || Horst (2–0) || Edgin (1–2) || Papelbon (36) || 21,741 || 66–82 || L4
|- style="text-align:center; background:#fbb;"
| 149 || September 20 || Phillies || 1–16 || Cloyd (2–1) || Hefner (2–7) || || 20,010 || 66–83 || L5
|- style="text-align:center; background:#bfb;"
| 150 || September 21 || Marlins || 7–3 || Niese (12–9) || Turner (2–4) || || 25,446 || 67–83 || W1
|- style="text-align:center; background:#bfb;"
| 151 || September 22 || Marlins || 4–3 || Dickey (19–6) || Buehrle (13–13) || Rauch (4) || 30,332 || 68–83 || W2
|- style="text-align:center; background:#bfb;"
| 152 || September 23 || Marlins || 3–2 || Parnell (5–4) || Webb (4–3) || || 26,923 || 69–83 || W3
|- style="text-align:center; background:#bfb;"
| 153 || September 24 || Pirates || 6–2 || Mejía (1–1) || McPherson (0–2) || || 22,072 || 70–83 || W4
|- style="text-align:center; background:#fbb;"
| 154 || September 25 || Pirates || 6–10 || Rodríguez (12–13) || McHugh (0–3) || || 25,286 || 70–84 || L1
|- style="text-align:center; background:#bfb;"
| 155 || September 26 || Pirates || 6–0 || Hefner (3–7) || Locke (0–3) || || 22,890 || 71–84 || W1
|- style="text-align:center; background:#bfb;"
| 156 || September 27 || Pirates || 6–5 || Dickey (20–6) || Correia (11–11) || Parnell (5) || 31,506 || 72–84 || W2
|- style="text-align:center; background:#bfb;"
| 157 || September 28 || @ Braves || 3–1 || Niese (13–9) || Hudson (16–7) || Parnell (6) || 51,910 || 73–84 || W3
|- style="text-align:center; background:#fbb;"
| 158 || September 29 || @ Braves || 0–2 || Minor (11–10) || Young (4–9) || Kimbrel (41) || 48,310 || 73–85 || L1
|- style="text-align:center; background:#fbb;"
| 159 || September 30 || @ Braves || 2–6 || Medlen (10–1) || Mejía (1–2) || Kimbrel (42) || 50,635 || 73–86 || L2
|-

|- style="text-align:center;background:#fbb;"
| 160 || October 1 || @ Marlins || L 2–3 || Bell (4–5) || Ramírez (3–4) || Cishek (15) || 24,543 || 73–87 || L3
|- style="text-align:center; background:#fbb;"
| 161 || October 2 || @ Marlins || L 3–4 || Gaudin (4–2) || McHugh (0–4) || || 29,709 || 73–88 || L4
|- style="text-align:center; background:#bfb;"
| 162 || October 3 || @ Marlins || W 4–2 || Hefner (4–7) || Koehler (0–1) || Parnell (7) || 27,418 || 74–88 || W1
|-

Roster

Player stats

Batting
Note: G = Games played; AB = At bats; R = Runs scored; H = Hits; 2B = Doubles; 3B = Triples; HR = Home runs; RBI = Runs batted in; SB = Stolen bases; BB = Base on balls; AVG = Batting average;

Pitching
Note: G = Games pitched; GS = Games started; W = Wins; L = Losses; SV = Saves; IP = Innings pitched; H = Hits allowed; R = Runs allowed; ER = Earned runs allowed; BB = Walks allowed; K = Strikeouts; ERA = Earned run average;

Farm system

References

External links
2012 New York Mets season Official Site
2012 New York Mets season at Baseball Reference
2012 New York Mets season at ESPN

New York Mets seasons
New York Mets season
New York Mets
2010s in Queens
Flushing, Queens